Edson Santana de Souza, usually known as Edson Souza (born 12 December 1964) is a Brazilian former football player and manager.

Honours

Player 
 Fluminense 
 Campeonato Brasileiro Série A: 1984
 Campeonato Carioca: 1983, 1984, 1985

 Cruzeiro
 Campeonato Mineiro: 1987

 Vasco da Gama
 Copa Rio: 1992

Manager 
 Nova Iguaçu 
 Copa Rio: 2008
Campeonato Carioca Série B1: 2016

 Resende 
 Copa Rio: 2014

Notes

1964 births
People from Santo André, São Paulo
Brazilian footballers
Brazilian football managers
Campeonato Brasileiro Série A players
Expatriate footballers in Portugal
Primeira Liga players
Campeonato Brasileiro Série D managers
Bonsucesso Futebol Clube players
Fluminense FC players
Cruzeiro Esporte Clube players
Bangu Atlético Clube players
São José Esporte Clube players
CR Vasco da Gama players
Esporte Clube Santo André players
Friburguense Atlético Clube players
C.F. União players
Madureira Esporte Clube players
America Football Club (RJ) players
Nova Iguaçu Futebol Clube managers
Bangu Atlético Clube managers
Friburguense Atlético Clube managers
Audax Rio de Janeiro Esporte Clube managers
Associação Atlética Portuguesa (RJ) managers
Resende Futebol Clube managers
Associação Desportiva Cabofriense managers
Living people
Association football midfielders
Esporte Clube São João da Barra managers
Footballers from São Paulo (state)
Footballers at the 1983 Pan American Games
Pan American Games silver medalists for Brazil
Pan American Games medalists in football
Medalists at the 1983 Pan American Games